The Little Doctor may refer to:

 The Little Doctor (c. 1901), a short film abridged as Sick Kitten
 Molecular Disruption Device, a concept in the Ender's Game book series.